Mukul Ahmed is a British-Bengali theatre director and producer.

Early life
In 1993, after moving to London, he saw an advert in the local newspaper that the old Half Moon Theatre wanted people to work on a play. He was selected and the production he worked on was Romeo and Juliet.

Career
In 2007, Mukul completed a Master of Fine Arts in theatre directing at Birkbeck, University of London. In April 2007, he helped launch TARA Studio as curator of the first season, Hotbed, for young and emerging BME directors.

Mukul has directed a series of classics, new writing and play readings. His maiden direction of an adaptation of The Adventures of Baron Munchausen in 2007 earned him four stars from The Times theatre critic. Other major plays directed by Mukul are Julius Caesar, The Rape of Lucrece, Romeo and Juliet, LONDONEE, Devdas, Enig-mas, Silent Sister's-Brother's Unhinged, Rokeya's Dream (based on Sultana's Dream), and Gauhar Jaan.

Mukul has staff directed at the Royal National Theatre, and directed People's Romeo (based on Romeo and Juliet) and an all female multinational Julius Caesar for Tara Arts. In July 2010, he directed Tahmima Anam's A Golden Age for the Southbank Centre. Ahmed also programmed a Youth Shakespeare Festival season at Tara Arts in 2010 and ran the Tara Arts young actors programme, ArtsBeat. He also programmed a Black History Month Festival.

Mukul has done an attachment with the Royal National Theatre under the Stepchange bursary programme.

Mukul is the artistic director of Mukul and Ghetto Tigers, an East London-based theatre company.

Works

Theatre

Festival / event / community / dance / installation

Opera

Personal life
Since 1990, Mukul has lived in Tower Hamlets, London.

See also
British Bangladeshis
List of British Bangladeshis

References

External links

Living people
Year of birth missing (living people)
Place of birth missing (living people)
Bangladeshi expatriates in the United Kingdom
British people of Bangladeshi descent
British theatre directors
British theatre managers and producers
Male dramatists and playwrights
British Asian writers
21st-century British writers
People from the London Borough of Tower Hamlets
Alumni of Birkbeck, University of London